Reinforced Safety Structure (RESS) is the brand name of an automotive safety body construction system by Malaysian carmaker, Proton. Debuted in 2012 via the Proton Preve, the RESS body structure is also currently being applied to the 2013 Proton Suprima S, the 2014 Proton Iriz and the 2016 Proton Persona. The RESS was developed by Proton in order to meet the tougher global crash safety regulations through the application of heat treatment and Hot Press Forming (HPF) technology.

Overview
Prior to the launch of the Prevé and Suprima S, Proton cars suffered from a poor safety reputation. For example, the Proton Jumbuck only scored one star in its ANCAP in 2009. Meanwhile, the Proton Waja was the first and thus far only Proton car to be officially crash tested by the Euro NCAP in 2002, where it scored three stars. The Proton Exora was the only pre-2012 car model that scored four stars in both ANCAP and Malaysia's own MyVAP (Malaysian Vehicle Assessment Program).

To develop the RESS, Proton acquired the Hot Press Forming (HPF) technology, making Proton the first carmaker in the ASEAN region and the sixth in the world to acquire the Hot Press Forming technology.[1][2][3] In the HPF technology, steel pieces are heated to 900 °C, and the red hot steel pieces are stamped before being quenched at four °C, changing the steel phase from austenite to martensite. The process increases the strength of steel parts from the original 500 MPa to 1,500 MPa.

In the RESS frame, the structure is reinforced by applying the parts being made from the HPF process for the main cabin structure to make the cabin more rigid, while the other structural parts are made from ordinary high-tensile steel. There are nine major structural parts that are made from the HPF process, namely:-
 Reinforcement Front Pillar Upper LH/RH
 Reinforcement Centre Pillar Inner LH/RH
 Reinforcement Centre Pillar Outer LH/RH
 Reinforcement Side Sill LH/RH
 Reinforcement Front Pillar Inner Lower LH/RH
 Panel Front Pillar Inner Upper LH/RH
 Front Impact Beam
 Reinforcement Crossmember Dash Lower RH
 Crossmember Front Floor Rear LH/RH

All Proton car models with RESS body structure scored the maximum five-star in both the ANCAP and ASEAN NCAP, starting from the 2012 Proton Preve, the 2013 Proton Suprima S, the 2014 Proton Iriz and the 2016 Proton Persona. To complement the RESS body structure, all Proton car models with RESS body structure also receive anti-lock braking system (ABS), electronic brakeforce distribution (EBD), brake assist (BA), traction control system, electronic stability program (ESC) and at least two airbags as standard.

See also
 Proton Prevé - the first Proton car model with RESS body structure
 Proton Suprima S
 Proton Iriz
 Proton Persona

References

RESS
RESS